Rebecca C. Tuite is a British author based in Los Angeles. She specializes in writing about fashion, costume and film history.

Early life and education

Tuite was born in Surrey, England. She earned a Bachelor of Arts degree in English from the University of Exeter. As an undergraduate, she was an exchange student at Vassar College. She earned a Master of Arts degree in fashion journalism from the London College of Fashion. She is studying toward a PhD at the Bard Graduate Center in New York City.

Career

Tuite's first book, published in 2014, was Seven Sisters Style: The All-American Preppy Look, which focused on the influence that students at the "Seven Sisters" (a group of prestigious all-female American colleges) had on fashion. Tuite explored the fashion trends initiated by Seven Sisters students during the first half of the twentieth century, and traced their subsequent popularity across the boundaries of fashion and film, particularly describing their influence on styles from American heritage brands including Ralph Lauren and Tommy Hilfiger. It was the first book exclusively dedicated to the female side of preppy style pioneered by American college girls. The book was featured in The Wall Street Journal, Vanity Fair, New York Magazine, Paris Vogue, and described by Refinery29 as "a beautifully illustrated, intensively researched celebration of the all-American preppy style pioneered by the women of the Seven Sisters Colleges — consider it a Take Ivy for the distaff set."

Her second book, published in 2019, was 1950s in Vogue: The Jessica Daves Years, 1952-1962. The book was the very first volume ever published that was solely dedicated to editor-in-chief, Jessica Daves, and her time at the helm of American Vogue. 1950s in Vogue appeared in The Los Angeles Times, Vogue, Vogue Paris, The New York Journal of Books, The New York Post and others. In their feature on the book, Vogue magazine noted, "Having poured over the 220 issues of the magazine edited by Daves, Tuite has organized her own book into eight sections focused on subjects from cocktail dressing to culture that demonstrate the breadth of Daves’s catholic interests." In their review, the New York Journal of Books observed, "Rarely, if ever, has this reader come across a book of this genre that was as thoroughly annotated, enlightening, informative and just incredible on so many different levels."

Selected works

References

American women non-fiction writers
American historians
Year of birth missing (living people)
Living people
21st-century American women